Catherine Creek is a  creek in northeastern Oregon, United States.  A tributary of the Grande Ronde River, it is the second-longest stream in the Grande Ronde Valley. Originating in the foothills of the Wallowa Mountains, it flows generally northwest through Catherine Creek State Park and the city of Union before joining the river.

The creek was named for Catherine Godley, a daughter of Thomas and M. E. Godley, who settled near Union in the 19th century. A former variant name for the stream on some maps was Ladd Creek. However, Ladd Creek on more recent maps is a stream flowing generally northeast from hills southeast of La Grande through the Ladd Marsh Game Management Area, joining Gekeler Slough before entering Catherine Creek. Little Creek, a tributary of Catherine Creek, was formerly called Julianna Creek for the Godleys' other daughter.

Course
Catherine Creek, flowing entirely within Union County, begins at the confluence of North Fork Catherine Creek and South Fork Catherine Creek in the Wallowa–Whitman National Forest. Running generally northwest from the foothills of the Wallowa Mountains along Oregon Route 203, the creek receives Scout and Milk creeks from the left, then Little Catherine Creek from the right before entering Catherine Creek State Park. Continuing northwest through the city of Union, the creek receives Pyles Creek from the left and Little Creek from the right before turning away from the highway. Meandering north across the Grande Ronde Valley, the creek receives Ladd Creek (below its confluence with Gekeler Slough) and McAlister Slough, both from the left, and Mill Creek from the right before entering the Grande Ronde River west of Cove. The larger stream is a tributary of the Snake River.

Recreation
Catherine Creek is open for catch-and-release fishing for wild steelhead downstream of the Highway 203 bridge above Catherine Creek State Park. Small wild rainbow trout also inhabit the upper creek and its forks.

The campground at the  state park is open from mid-April through October. The park also has picnic areas, restrooms, horseshoe pits, and hiking trails.

See also
List of rivers of Oregon

References

External links
Grande Ronde Model Watershed

Rivers of Union County, Oregon
Rivers of Oregon